South Dakota Highway 79 (SD 79) is a  state highway in western South Dakota, United States, that runs from Maverick Junction near the Black Hills National Forest to the North Dakota state line.

Route description
SD 79's southern terminus is at Maverick Junction near Hot Springs, where it meets US 18 and US 385. SD 79 runs east of the Black Hills to Rapid City, where it joins US Route 16 Truck Bypass around the east side of Rapid City up to Interstate 90. The road continues north and runs concurrently with US 14 and Interstate 90 westbound toward Sturgis. Leaving Sturgis, SD 79 leads to Bear Butte State Park and briefly runs concurrently with U.S. Route 212 south of Newell. Near North Dakota, the highway passes through the South Dakota portion of Custer National Forest. SD 79 then joins SD 20 for a short concurrent run, and finally turns northward until it reaches North Dakota.

Major intersections

See also

 List of state highways in South Dakota

References

External links

079
Transportation in Fall River County, South Dakota
Transportation in Custer County, South Dakota
Transportation in Pennington County, South Dakota
Transportation in Meade County, South Dakota
Transportation in Butte County, South Dakota
Transportation in Harding County, South Dakota